Francis Joseph Nicholson O.C.D. (29 April 180330 April 1855) was a Roman Catholic archbishop of Corfu, then in the United States of the Ionian Islands, a British protectorate. He was born in Dublin, Ireland.

Around the middle of the 19th century, he played a role in an attempt to establish diplomatic recognition between the Holy See and the United Kingdom.

Chronology 
 23 March 1825 : professed Member of the Order of the Discalced Carmelites
 1828 : ordained Priest of the Order of the Discalced Carmelites
 27 March 1846 : Appointed Titular Bishop of Tamasus (did not take effect)
 12 May 1846 : Appointed Coadjutor Archbishop of Corfu, Ionian Islands, assisting incumbent Pier-Antonio Nostrano, with the title of Titular Bishop of Hierapolis
 24 May 1846 : Ordained Titular Bishop of Hierapolis
 May 1852 : Succeeded as Archbishop of Corfu

References

1803 births
1855 deaths
Irish Roman Catholic archbishops
Roman Catholic archbishops of Corfu
United States of the Ionian Islands people
Discalced Carmelite bishops
Irish expatriate Catholic bishops
People from County Dublin